The 1974-75 NBA season was the Kings' 26th season in the NBA and their third season in the city of Kansas City.

Draft picks

Roster

Regular season

Season standings

z – clinched division title
y – clinched division title
x – clinched playoff spot

Record vs. opponents

Playoffs

|- align="center" bgcolor="#ffcccc"
| 1
| April 9
| @ Chicago
| L 89–95
| Larry McNeill (22)
| Sam Lacey (13)
| Tiny Archibald (7)
| Chicago Stadium15,433
| 0–1
|- align="center" bgcolor="#ccffcc"
| 2
| April 13
| Chicago
| W 102–95
| Jimmy Walker (26)
| Sam Lacey (20)
| Tiny Archibald (12)
| Kemper Arena11,378
| 1–1
|- align="center" bgcolor="#ffcccc"
| 3
| April 16
| @ Chicago
| L 90–93
| Tiny Archibald (18)
| Sam Lacey (18)
| Scott Wedman (4)
| Chicago Stadium18,347
| 1–2
|- align="center" bgcolor="#ccffcc"
| 4
| April 18
| Chicago
| W 104–100 (OT)
| Tiny Archibald (28)
| Sam Lacey (16)
| Sam Lacey (8)
| Kemper Arena14,945
| 2–2
|- align="center" bgcolor="#ffcccc"
| 5
| April 20
| @ Chicago
| L 77–104
| Wedman, Archibald (13)
| Sam Lacey (12)
| Sam Lacey (5)
| Chicago Stadium16,247
| 2–3
|- align="center" bgcolor="#ffcccc"
| 6
| April 23
| Chicago
| L 89–101
| Tiny Archibald (26)
| Sam Lacey (15)
| Sam Lacey (5)
| Kemper Arena12,445
| 2–4
|-

Awards and records
 Phil Johnson, NBA Coach of the Year Award
 Nate Archibald, All-NBA First Team
 Scott Wedman, NBA All-Rookie Team First Team

References

Kansas City-Omaha
Sacramento Kings seasons
Kansas
Kansas